Bagenal or Bagnal is a surname, and may refer to:

 Beauchamp Bagenal
 Dudley Bagenal, an Irish soldier
 Frances Bagenal 
 Henry Bagenal, an Irish soldier
 Hope Bagenal 
 Lord Bagenal
 Nicholas Bagenal, an English-born Irish soldier

See also
Bagnall (disambiguation)